Gunmen is a 1994 American action comedy film directed by Deran Sarafian and starring Mario Van Peebles, Christopher Lambert, Denis Leary, Kadeem Hardison, and Patrick Stewart. Robert Harper and Brenda Bakke are co-stars of the film. It was second film collaboration between Lambert, John Flock and John Davis, after Fortress.

Plot
Wheelchair-bound drug baron Peter Loomis (Patrick Stewart) has his $400 million drug fortune stolen in South America by his errand boy Carlos, who stashed the fortune on an undisclosed boat in an undisclosed harbor. Loomis sends ruthless killer Armor O'Malley (Denis Leary) to find the boat and recover the money—he and sidekick Marie (Brenda Bakke) kill Carlos before they can get the name and location of the boat, but they learn that Carlos's brother Dani (Christopher Lambert) knows where it is, and set out to find him.

Dani is sprung from a South American prison by Cole Parker (Mario Van Peebles), a bounty hunter working for the DEA who is bent on taking down Loomis—Cole knows the name of the boat, Dani knows the location, and both men want the money for their own reasons. Complicating matters is a mole in the DEA who feeds intel to O'Malley about the heroes' movements. Alone and outnumbered, Cole and Dani are forced into a reluctant alliance as they quest for the 400 million dollar boat, with O'Malley and his men chasing them every step of the way.

Loomis quickly realizes that O'Malley wants the fortune for himself and tries to have him and his men assassinated, but the attempt fails. O'Malley returns to Loomis's estate and makes it clear that he now wears the pants in their relationship: without the $400 million, Loomis can't pay his soldiers, and O'Malley will get his hands on the money before the stay-at-home cripple does. Loomis is killed and O'Malley renews the chase with a small army at his disposal.

After numerous betrayals on both sides of the conflict, the chase ends at a Puerto Vallarta harbor, and a yacht called the "Matador" according to Cole. Dani and Cole shoot it out with O'Malley's soldiers and leave the boat a flaming wreck (and Dani beside himself at the loss of the money). But Cole reveals he lied about the boat name to mislead and eliminate O'Malley: the fortune was actually stashed on a rickety old fishing boat called the "Gunmen". The heroes agree to split the money and sail into the sunset.

Cast

Christopher Lambert as Dani Servigo
Mario Van Peebles as Cole Parker
Denis Leary as Armor O'Malley
Patrick Stewart as Peter Loomis
Kadeem Hardison as Izzy
Sally Kirkland as Bennett
Richard C. Sarafian as Chief Chavez
Robert Harper as Rance
Brenda Bakke as Maria
Humberto Elizondo as Guzman
Deran Sarafian as Bishop
Christopher Michael as Rhodes
Rena Riffel as Mrs. Loomis
Big Daddy Kane as himself
Kid Frost as himself
Rakim as himself
Eric B. as himself
Doctor Dré as himself
Ed Lover as himself
Christopher Williams as himself

Production
Gunmen was filmed in nine weeks between April 20 and June 18 of 1992, but it wasn't released until February 4 of 1994 in the USA after the Hungarian release on May 23 of 1993, more than a year and a half after it was finished. Besides releasing all the later DVD versions of the movie in the cropped 1.33:1 pan and scan format instead of 2.35:1 widescreen in which the movie was originally filmed, Miramax and Dimension Films also cut it down by around five minutes before it was released theatrically only on 800 screens. The film was originally much more hard-edged, featuring greater violence and language, and most of the cuts were made on those scenes because the studios wanted to make it a more accessible R-rated action film. The uncut version of the film was never released.

Widescreen availability
The original widescreen 2.35:1 aspect ratio cut is available for purchase on Apple's US iTunes Store. There are two known DVD versions of Gunmen which present the film in its original 2.35:1 aspect ratio: The Japanese release from Columbia Tristar and a Hungarian version released as Fenegyerekek. All other versions of the DVD are only presented in a cropped 1.33:1 format.

Soundtrack
The official soundtrack to the film, Gunmen (Music From the Original Motion Picture Soundtrack), was released on December 21, 1993 through MCA Records. The soundtrack consists of hip hop, reggae, rock, and R&B music.

Track listing

Reception
Gunmen holds a 15% approval rating on Rotten Tomatoes based on 13 reviews; the average rating is 3.3/10. Emanuel Levy of Variety wrote: "Mindlessly cartoonish, Gunmen lacks the expected frills and spiteful tension of a serviceable actioner".

Year-end lists
 Worst films (not ranked) – Jeff Simon, The Buffalo News
 Top 18 worst (alphabetically listed, not ranked) – Michael Mills, The Palm Beach Post

References

External links
 
 
 

1994 films
1994 action thriller films
American action comedy films
American buddy films
Films scored by John Debney
Films produced by Laurence Mark
Films directed by Deran Sarafian
Davis Entertainment films
Dimension Films films
Artisan Entertainment films
1990s English-language films
1990s American films